Signs of Life is the debut album by the Finnish alternative rock band Poets of the Fall. It was released on 19 January 2005 and debuted at number-one on the Finnish charts. The album was certified platinum on 26 April 2006 and remained in the Top 40 for more than one year (56 weeks). The album was released on the iTunes Music Shop in Finland, Norway, Denmark and Sweden in August 2005. It was released on iTunes for worldwide purchase on 12 April 2008. A limited vinyl-edition was released on the band's official webshop on 19 January 2011.

Trivia
The track "Seek You Out" has never been played live.

The booklet contains song lyrics as well as the special code to "elusive bonus" features on the band's official website, which include a remix of the song Lift and several wallpapers based on booklet artworks and the Lift video.

Track listing

Release history

Singles

("Illusion & Dream" and "Stay" were also radio-only promo singles; they were not released as physical singles and no videos were made)

Awards and nominations

Awards

Nominations

References 

Poets of the Fall albums
2005 debut albums